The following is a list of characters that first appeared in the New Zealand soap opera Shortland Street in 1992, by order of first appearance.

Marj Neilson 

Marj Neilson was the clinic's first receptionist and was portrayed by Elizabeth McRae. A religious busy body and gossip, Marj became a staple and iconic of the show, being the shows original matriarch and leader of the Neilson family unit. She stayed on the show until 1996 and still remains one of the most iconic characters, returning for several guest stints.

Tom Neilson

Tom Leslie Neilson was the husband of Marj and the show's original paramedic. Tom stayed on the show for a year and his story lines covered illness and the hugely famous missing person scenario where Tom left his family and went into hiding, then later died of a heartattack

Sam Aleni

Sam Aleni was the Samoan paramedic who appeared on the show for 4 years. The casting of Sam proved groundbreaking, placing a Polynesian in the occupation of paramedic, with there being only one real life case in New Zealand. Rene Naufahu portrayed Sam, with his younger brother Joe Naufahu playing Sam's brother Nat.

Lisa Stanton

Lisa Stanton was the teenage girl who gave birth in the show's first ever episode. Originally thought to be the celibate Stuart's (Martin Henderson) lover, it soon turned out Lisa's baby daughter was really Stuart's married brother - Darryl's (Mark Ferguson).

Stuart Neilson

Stuart Neilson was the teenage son of Marj and Tom who went from being a shy devout Catholic, to a sturdy business man. The character was portrayed by Martin Henderson from the first episode up until early 1995.

Carrie Burton 

Carrie Burton was the strict director of nursing, played by Lisa Crittenden. She was part of the original cast and appeared from the first episode up until November the following year.

In 1992 Carrie was accused of helping Sam's (Rene Naufahu) cousin to die and was arrested but not charged. The stress of the accusation led Carrie to date hospital CEO - Michael (Paul Gittins). The relationship didn't last and Carrie briefly dated a builder through the new year. Desperate to have children, Carrie decided to get a colleague to donate his sperm and accepted samples from Chris (Michael Galvin), Steve (Andrew Binns), Hone Ropata (Temuera Morrison) and Guy (Craig Parker). Carrie fell pregnant and started to date Steve's mysterious father - Declan (Kevin J. Wilson). The two married in Las Vegas and bought the local bar in Carrie's name. Carrie gave birth to triplets in September but received little support from Declan and ended up relying on Steve. The two eventually admitted their mutual feelings following the revelation Declan was a criminal. However blackmail from Declan's dodgy associates made Carrie flee to Australia with her three children after one final kiss with Steve. In November 1995, Chris visited Carrie and the triplets so that he could introduce his father Bruce (Ken Blackburn) to them before he died.

Carrie's son Finn (Lukas Whiting) returns to Ferndale in 2016 to meet his father and announces that Carrie has recently died.

Tara Milburn

Tara Milburn was a petty thief who faked an injury so she could steal from the hospital. She appeared in a two episode stint that resulted in her confession.

Alison Raynor

Alison Raynor was the innocent farm girl nurse. She was portrayed by Danielle Cormack and was part of the series original cast. Cormack enjoyed the experience at first, but after a year was sick of the show and decided to leave. She became the first character to leave the show. In 2010, whilst times were hard, Cormack considered returning to the show only to find out her character had been killed off.

Alison dated Chris (Michael Galvin) and flatted with two men, a fact she had to keep hidden from her parents. She learned from flatmate - Steve (Andrew Binns) that Chris had cheated on her with Jill (Suzy Aiken) and the two briefly broke up before they got back together and engaged. However the marriage was not to be and Chris left Alison, only for her to discover she was pregnant. In 1993 Alison tragically suffered a miscarriage and grew close to the villainous Darryl (Mark Ferguson). However she rejected Darryl's advances and reunited with Chris and soon the two got engaged. However Darryl drugged Chris and prevented him from attending the ceremony and Alison fled Ferndale in tears at the apparent betrayal. Jaki (Nancy Brunning) later attended Alison's wedding overseas to a French man. Alison returned in late 1993 seeking plastic surgery so she would be unrecognizable to her husband - Jean-Luc (Pierre Foret) who had turned out to be abusive and a terrorist. Alison ended up being confronted by Jean-Luc at her family farm and while attempting to kill his wife, Jean-Luc tripped and fell to his death. Alison soon left the country once again.

In 1997 Tiffany Pratt (Alison James) reported the end to her marriage with Chris after discovering him in bed with Alison. Chris and Alison later married but divorced soon after. In 2010 it was revealed that Alison had died the previous year but in 1996, had given birth to Chris' son Phoenix Raynor (Geordie Holibar) following their separation.

Hone Ropata

Dr. Hone Ropata was the no nonsense doctor played by Temuera Morrison. Hone often found himself playing against the rules and remained on the show until 1995. The character made a high-profile return for the show's 4000th episode in 2008.

Kirsty Knight

Kirsty Knight was the "blonde bombshell" who worked the reception desk opposite Marj. Played by Angela Dotchin from 1992 to 1998, the character picked up an icon status and remains as one of the most iconic characters to feature on the soap.

Michael McKenna

Dr. Michael McKenna was the CEO of the clinic who was portrayed by Paul Gittins up until 1995. He returned in guest stints in both 1997 and 1998 and remains known as the patriarch of the McKenna family which produced the iconic character - Rachel (Angela Bloomfield).

Chris Warner

Dr. Chris Warner was the playboy doctor who went by the nickname "Dr. Love". Chris was portrayed by Michael Galvin up until 1996. However the character returned 4 years later and remains presently, being the longest running character to appear on the show.

Jill Johnstone

Jill Johnstone was the fitness trainer who had a brief affair with Chris Warner (Michael Galvin). It soon turned out Jill was married and the affair broke up Chris' relationship with Alison (Danielle Cormack).

Reception
Jill and Chris' sex scene in the first episode remains as heavily iconic and has been stated as setting the tone for the rest of the series.

Steve Mills

Steve Mills was the joker nurse who was played by Andrew Binns from 1992 up until the characters iconic death in 1994.

Jenny Harrison

Jenny Harrison (previously Seymour) was the original personal assistant to CEO Michael McKenna (Paul Gittins). Played by Maggie Harper, she was a divorcee who had suffered abuse from her husband and mothered his son - Nick (Karl Burnett).

Nick Harrison

Nick Harrison was the mischievous son of Jenny (Maggie Harper) and on/off best friend of Stuart (Martin Henderson). Portrayed by Karl Burnett, Nick stayed on the show until 2005, making him the longest running original character.

Gina Rossi

Gina Rossi-Dodds (née Rossi) was the eccentric owner of the clinic cafe. Played by Josephine Davison, Gina appeared until 1994, appearing again later in the year.

Storylines
Gina became infatuated with hunky doctor - Hone Ropata (Temuera Morrison), but the arrival of Leonard Dodds (Marton Csokas) in 1993 sent Gina into a smitten obsession and the two started to date. However, in Leonard's absence, Gina flirted with Hone and once Leonard returned, he couldn't forgive Gina and they broke up. The two eventually reconciled but Gina refused to get married due to the "Shortland Street curse" where no weddings could go to plan. However Michael (Paul Gittins) encouraged the two and they ended up getting married in November 1993. They bought a houseboat together and after Leonard cured his sea sickness, the two tried for children. However Gina learned she had low fertility and the two decided to move overseas, gifting the ownership of the cafe to Lionel (John Leigh).

They returned later that year to be bridesmaid and bestman at Lionel and Kirsty's (Angela Dotchin) wedding. However Gina had become a soap star whilst overseas and her presence brought paparazzi to the service. Gina and Leonard left shortly after the wedding's second attempt in early 1995. In late 1995 it was announced that the couple had a son named Leonardo.

Jaki Manu

Jaki Manu was the busybody and efficient nurse. She was portrayed by Nancy Brunning until 1994. In 1992 controversy struck when Jaki was pricked by a needle from an HIV patient - Deborah (Lisa Chappell). Ostracized by her peers, Jaki was relieved when she was finally cleared of the illness. She started to date Black Caps  cricketer - Henry (Tamati Rice) but when he brought an infectious disease into the clinic and cheated on her, the relationship was over. Jaki grew close to Rob Hawkins (unknown actor) but refused to help him kill his sick wife. He later did kill her and started a relationship with Jaki however the guilt got to her and they broke up. Jaki received a promotion at work and was shocked to see Henry come into hospital in early 1994. She persuaded him to retire from cricket due to the muscle stress and the two left Ferndale together.

Meredith Fleming

Dr. Meredith Fleming was the single mother new doctor in Ferndale portrayed by Stephanie Wilkin until 1993 and again in 1994. The character became famous as being part of the shows first lesbian storyline.

Storylines
Meredith arrived in town in May 1992 and soon got involved with Hone Ropata (Temuera Morrison). The romance was short and she briefly dated Guy Warner (Craig Parker), making Guy's brother - Chris (Michael Galvin) jealous. Meredith's young son - Andrew (Ezra Wood) soon arrived on her door step and she got back together with Hone. However into 1993, the two broke up and Andrew's father kidnapped him, eventually leading to Andrew being placed in Meredith's mothers care. A distraught Meredith ended up with Guy and the two eventually decided to leave Ferndale. However the revelation that Guy had cheated on Meredith with Jenny (Maggie Harper) separated the two and Meredith got shot by a crazed patient. An injured Meredith forgave Guy and departed to Dunedin alone. She returned the following year and became attracted to  Annie Flynn (Rebecca Hobbs). The two eventually started to date and returned to Dunedin together.

Deborah Walters

Deborah Walters was the HIV patient who was a patient at the clinic. She starred in a high-profile ethical storyline in May 1992 when a needle used on her accidentally pricked Jaki Manu (Nancy Brunning). The two became friends and Jaki was eventually cleared of the illness. Deborah returned in late 1993 wanting plastic surgery. Michael (Paul Gittins) advised her against the operation due to her HIV and she eventually agreed not to go through with it. Whilst in the clinic, she developed a friendship with Guy Warner (Craig Parker) and the two briefly dated before she departed once again.

Bruce Warner

Sir Bruce Warner was the arrogant father of Chris Warner (Michael Galvin). He was played by Ken Blackburn for numerous stints in the nineties.

Margot Warner

Margot, Lady Warner (née Worthington) was the alcoholic mother of Chris Warner (Michael Galvin). She was portrayed by Glynis McNicoll throughout the nineties and by Dinah Priestley for her death in 2003.

Margot and husband - Bruce (Ken Blackburn) visited Chris in 1992 and the following year Margot was shocked to learn her daughter, Amanda (Stephanie Jack) was still alive with Bruce claiming she had died at birth. The loveless marriage took a toll on Margot and she turned to alcohol and Guy (Craig Parker) convinced her to seek help. At the alcoholic help groups, she befriended Bruce's rival - Michael McKenna (Paul Gittins) and many suspected an affair. Margot returned for Guys birthday in 1994 and expressed concern at Chris' interracial relationship with Rebecca Frost (Luisa Burgess). In 1995 following Bruce's death, Margot confessed she was not Guy's biological mother but nonetheless was thrilled with the arrival of his daughter - Tuesday (uncredited actress). In 1996 she attended Chris' wedding. In 2003 a very sick Margot reappeared and became friendly with Dom (Shane Cortese). Chris suspected Dom was after his mother's money and when she succumbed to her cancer, was shocked that Dom was included in her will. It was soon revealed that Margot had discovered Dom was the result of an affair Bruce had, meaning he was Chris' half-brother. This was later disproven but as a result of bitter jealousy, Dom carried out a long-term smear campaign against Chris and attempted to murder him. In 2014, Chris' newborn daughter Trinity (Maya Ruriko Doura) was given the middle-name of Margot in her grandmothers honour.

Claire Lloyd

Claire Lloyd was the cheating fiancé of Hone Ropata (Temuera Morrison). The two got engaged prior to the first episode and she was the reason Hone moved to Ferndale. However she started an affair with both Chris Warner (Michael Galvin) and Michael McKenna (Paul Gittins), which resulted in Hone dumping her.

Irene Raynor

Irene Raynor was the nosey mother of Alison Raynor (Danielle Cormack). She was portrayed by Jan Saussey in two stints in 1992 and 1993. She first appeared in 1992 and was disgusted Alison was flatting with two male flatmates. Her friendship with Tom Neilson (Adrian Keeling) led many to believe the two were having an affair and resulted in Marj (Elizabeth McRae) confronting Irene however this was not the case. Irene returned in 1993 to witness her daughters marriage to Chris Warner (Michael Galvin) however when Chris did not show, Irene escorted her daughter to the airport to depart Ferndale.

Kevin Raynor

Kevin Raynor was the father of Alison Raynor (Danielle Cormack). He appeared alongside his wife for stints in both 1992 and 1993. He was disgusted in 1992 when he discovered Alison was flatting with two males. In 1993 he and Irene drove Alison to the airport following the belief Chris (Michael Galvin) had abandoned her at the altar.

In 2010 Kevin's brother Brian (Ian Mune) arrived on the show in a recurring guest role.

Andrew Fleming

Andrew Fleming was the young son of Meredith Fleming (Stephanie Wilkin). Andrew was raised by his grandparents but came to live with Meredith in mid-1992. However several problems arose such as Andrew going missing and accidentally shooting himself in the head. However the presence of Meredith's boyfriend Hone Ropata (Temuera Morrison) proved calming for the child. However, after getting to know his father, Andrew ended up getting kidnapped by him and following Meredith being blamed, Andrew returned to his grandparents.

Eddie Tali

Eddie Tali appeared for a week in mid 1992. Eddie was the sick cousin of Sam Aleni (Rene Naufahu) who took his own life instead of dealing with a terminal illness. His nurse Carrie Burton (Lisa Crittenden) was arrested for his murder and later his father Vai arrived to New Zealand and blamed Sam for his death.

Ana Aleni

Ana Aleni née Tali (credited as Mrs. Aleni in her nineties appearances) appeared in a recurring role for several years, portrayed by Adele Paris. She first appeared in 1992 when her son Sam Aleni (Rene Naufahu) struggled with the truth he had defied his fate and had sex before marriage. The following year, Ana tried to recover her youngest son Nat (Joe Naufahu) from Sam's flat after he ran away from home. However, with help from Sam, she decided it was best he stayed. She opposed Sam's relationship to the Tongan TP (Elizabeth Skeen) but following their marriage, came to appreciate her. In 1994 she attended TP's memorial service following her death. In 1996 Ana tried to set Sam up with a family friend named Malia, but it soon became apparent to all that Sam was still not ready after the death of his wife. Ana visited Ferndale in 2014 and made it clear she disproved of Sam's young girlfriend Emma Franklin (Amy Usherwood) due to her belief Sam was still struggling with the death of both TP and his second wife, Alise.

May McKenna

May McKenna appeared as the sick mother of Michael McKenna (Paul Gittins). May was in hospital extremely sick and announced she was to marry George Bentley (Bruce Allpress). Aware that his mother was near death, Michael assumed George was after her money and opposed. However this turned out not to be the case and the two married with Michael's blessing. In 2011, it was stated that Rachel (Angela Bloomfield) and Jonathon (Kieren Hutchison) were the last remaining McKennas alive, suggesting May had died.

George Bentley

George Bentley appeared in guest stints in both 1992 and 1993. George first appeared when Nick Harrison (Karl Burnett) began volunteering at the local rest home. He arrived to the clinic in August 1992 to accompany May McKenna (Mary De Koster) as she was suffering from pneumonia. May's son Michael (Paul Gittins) was shocked when the two announced their intention to marry and believed George was after May's money. George proved he loved her and the two married. The following year George was hospitalised.

Sarah Donnelly

Sarah Donnelly was a fun loving nurse and love interest for Steve Mills (Andrew Binns). She arrived in mid-1992 and instantly attracted the attentions of prankster nurse - Steve. Initially hesitant to enter a relationship with the immature nurse, she eventually fell in love and the two dated for several months. However late in the year whilst Steve talked marriage, Sarah revealed she had terminal melanoma. Sad and desperate to impress, Steve threw Sarah a birthday party in December 1992 only for Sarah to die in his arms.

Noel Sturgess

Noel Sturgess appeared sporadically throughout the shows first 3 years. He was the primary share holder of the Shortland Street clinic. He arrived to the hospital as a patient requiring heart surgery in mid-1992 and instantly came across as gross and creepy to the young women staff. He took a liking to doctor - Chris Warner (Michael Galvin) and showed sexual interest in Kirsty (Angela Dotchin). He hired Kirsty as his temporary personal assistant in the clinic and sexually harassed Carrie (Lisa Crittenden). He offered Kirsty a full-time contract and left when she declined. He returned the following year after the nurses went on strike. He considered selling out the hospital but ended up keeping his shares. In 1994 Noel returned and was skeptical at his daughter Hilary's (Susan Brady) financial scheme for the hospital. Jenny (Maggie Harper) pondered Noel about his late wife and he admitted he treated her poorly. Noel had a heart attack moments later and died. His shares of the hospital were given to Hilary.

Martyn Sanderson found it difficult playing such a hard nosed and unpleasant character but knew it was part of the job. His only request was that when his character was to be killed off, he wanted Noel to die off screen so as not to scare his grandchildren.

Barry Harrison

Barry Harrison was the abusive former husband of Jenny Harrison (Maggie Harper) and father of Nick (Karl Burnett). Nick contacted Barry in October 1992 and invited him over when he realized Jenny had moved on. Barry and Jenny reunited however in November, Barry hit Jenny and she broke up with him. It later turned out Barry had abused Jenny for years and was a cause for their divorce.

Miles Lucas

Miles Lucas was the school friend of Nick Harrison (Karl Burnett) and Stuart Neilson (Martin Henderson). Nick became friends with Miles and introduced him to Stuart who got on better with him due to their similar articulate interests. However shortly after Stuarts 16th birthday party, Miles intentionally overdosed on pills, killing himself. Both boys were shocked and the death ended the twos friendship. On Halloween of that year, Alison Raynor (Danielle Cormack) believed the clinic was haunted by Miles' ghost. On Halloween 1993, Stuart, Nick and Rachel (Angela Bloomfield) used a ouija board and believed that they contacted Miles.

Guy Warner

Guy Warner was the guidance councilor brother of Chris Warner (Michael Galvin). Craig Parker played him in a guest stint in 1992 before returning as a regular from 1993 to 1996. He appeared again in 2007.

Jane Fitzgerald

Jane Fitzgerald was the illegitimate daughter of Marj Neilson (Elizabeth McRae). Portrayed by Katherine McRae, the character was adopted out at birth and made contact with Marj in late 1992. She got on well with her mother but not so well with her step father - Tom (Adrian Keeling), who ended up running away. Jane eventually left for a job in Wellington. Several months later she moved to Australia.

Melanie Kirk

Melanie Kirk was the vindictive ex-wife of Chris Warner (Michael Galvin). She arrived in late 1992 and tried to warn Chris' fiancé - Alison (Danielle Cormack) off him. Chris eventually dumped Alison and reconciled with Melanie however the reconciliation was short lived and Melanie left Chris for further job opportunities. She returned 13 years later and Chris' new wife - Toni (Laura Hill), suspected Melanie of trying to get Chris back. However Melanie revealed she had Fibromuscular Dysplasia and manipulated Chris into performing the risky operation.

Serena Hughes

Serena Hughes was Nick's (Karl Burnett) first girlfriend. Nick used the gothic Serena to get on his mother's bad side but much to his shock the two got on well and Nick eventually fell in love, losing his virginity to her. However, when Serena started spending time with Stuart, Nick jumped to the conclusion that Serena was two-timing him with Stuart and grew jealous. The two split up and Serena left town for good.

Henry Tamariki

Henry Tamariki was introduced as a love interest for Jaki Manu (Nancy Brunning). Henry entered the hospital with an injury from playing cricket in late 1992 and soon started to date the smitten Jaki. However, when Henry brought an illness in from another country, Jaki had little time for Henry and he strayed from the relationship and it ended. Henry returned the following year, seriously injured from bowling. A still hurt Jaki discouraged Henry from continuing cricket but when she refused to admit her true feelings for him, Henry continued. However, the two eventually confessed their love and Henry retired. The two moved to England.

References

1992
, Shortland Street